Australia at the 1990 Commonwealth Games was abbreviated AUS. This was their fourteenth of 14 Commonwealth Games having participated in all Games meets up to these Games.

Medallists

'The following Australian competitors won medals at the games.

| style="text-align:left; width:78%; vertical-align:top;"|

| width="22%" align="left" valign="top" |

Australian team
The Australian Team also included triathletes for the very first time as the sport made its Commonwealth Games debut as a demonstration sport. The triathlon team included just one athlete who would go on represent Australia at the Olympic Games, a decade later in Sydney when triathlon officially debuted on the world stage. That athlete was Michellie Jones.

Officials

See also 
 Australia at the 1988 Summer Olympics
 Australia at the 1992 Summer Olympics

References

Australia Commonwealth Games Association
thecgf

1990
Nations at the 1990 Commonwealth Games
Commonwealth Games